Eugène Cuniot-Hury (1861–1910) was a French archetier and bow maker based in Mirecourt, France.

Eugène Cuniot-Hury was son of Pierre Cuniot who was also an archetier / bow maker. Eugene Cuniot-Hury apprenticed with his father and became the teacher and employer of many outstanding French archetiers including:
Emile Francois Ouchard (apprenticed with him 1886-1910 and succeeded his business), Pierre Maline and Louis Morizot. Alfred Lamy worked for Cuniot-Hury as well.

References 

 
 
 
 Dictionnaire Universel del Luthiers - Rene Vannes 1951,1972, 1985 (vol.3)

1861 births
1910 deaths
Bow makers
19th-century French people
Luthiers from Mirecourt